Amir Nouri (born 10 July 1994) is a French professional footballer who plays as a midfielder for  club Stade Briochin.

Career
A youth product of Évian, Nouri began his career with Montceau and Martigues in the amateur leagues of France. He made his professional debut in a 2–0 Ligue 2 win over AS Nancy.

Personal life
Nouri was born in Lyon to a family of Algerian descent. He is an educational assistant at the Collège Roger Vailland.

References

External links
 
 

1994 births
French sportspeople of Algerian descent
Footballers from Lyon
Living people
French footballers
Association football midfielders
Football Bourg-en-Bresse Péronnas 01 players
FC Montceau Bourgogne players
FC Martigues players
AS Béziers (2007) players
K.S.V. Roeselare players
LB Châteauroux players
Stade Briochin players
Ligue 2 players
Championnat National players
Championnat National 2 players
Championnat National 3 players
Challenger Pro League players
French expatriate footballers
French expatriate sportspeople in Belgium
Expatriate footballers in Belgium